Öküzlü is an archaeological site in Mersin Province, Turkey.

Geography
Öküzlü (Öküzlüklü) is situated in the rural area of Erdemli district which is rich in archaeological ruins. There are many ruins around Öküzlü . Kanlıdivane and Elaiussa Sebaste are to the south, Emirzeli is to the west, Tapureli ruins are to the north of Öküzlü.

History
The original name of the site is not known. Turkish name Öküzlü (literally "with ox") refers to reliefs of oxen on column heads (now in Mersin Museum). Archaeological evidence from masonry imply that the site can be backdated to Hellenistic era. It was however reconstructed in the 5th or 6th centuries, i.e., early Byzantine era.

The ruins

The house ruins in the north of the site are examples of the polygonal and Byzantine  masonry. One house is a peristyle house. The foundations of some buildings are carved rock. There are sarcophagi along the road. At the center of the site there are ruins of a basilica. The basilica with three naves and a transept is backdated to about 500.

References

Archaeological sites in Mersin Province, Turkey
Former populated places in Turkey
Ancient Greek archaeological sites in Turkey
Erdemli District
Olba territorium